Hamilton Boyd was an American politician who served as mayor of Portland, Oregon, in 1868-69.  He is thought to have come to Portland in 1860, worked as an assistant county clerk, and later worked as an accountant in the Ladd & Tilton bank.  He was elected to a two-year term as county commissioner in 1868 and served as mayor from 1868 to 1869.  He was elected mayor on June 16, 1868, and assumed office later that month. He was succeeded as mayor by Bernard Goldsmith in 1869.

Sources differ on when Boyd died, with at least one source saying he died in Portland in 1886, while The Oregonian reported that he died in March 1883.

He is buried in the Lone Fir Cemetery in Portland.

References 

Multnomah County Commissioners
1830s births
1880s deaths
Mayors of Portland, Oregon
19th-century American politicians
Burials at Lone Fir Cemetery